KWDQ (102.3 FM) is a radio station airing an active rock format licensed to Woodward, Oklahoma. The station is owned by Classic Communications, Inc.

References

External links
KWDQ's official website

Active rock radio stations in the United States
WDQ